The third season of the television drama series Winners & Losers was aired in three parts on the Seven Network in Australia. Season 3A – comprising 13 episodes – aired from 9 July to 25 September 2013 while Season 3B – comprising 13 episodes – aired from 28 January to 24 June 2014, before the immediate start of season 4. It replaced Packed to the Rafters due to the series ending. Season three follows the lives of Jenny, Bec, Sophie and Frances four months on from the death of Bec's husband Matt. Filming for the season began in September 2012 and wrapped in July 2013.

Production 
On 7 August 2012, it was announced that Seven has renewed Winners & Losers for a third season to air in 2013.

Julie McGauran, the head of Drama at Seven stated, "2013 is going to be a landmark year for Channel Seven's drama department. Our drama slate is at full capacity with the return of Winners & Losers as well as Packed to the Rafters, Home and Away and the new drama A Place to Call Home." Filming for the third season began on 24 September 2012 and wrapped on 4 July 2013.

Of the series, Melanie Vallejo told Scott Gavin from TV Week, "the show has evolved quite a bit. It's not just about four girls anymore. Each of their four worlds has become bigger and more complicated." Of the return of the third series, Erin Millar from the same publication wrote, "there's plenty of love in the air, but this season won't be all about romance."

Script producer, Dan Bennett confirmed that there are 26 episodes in season three.

Plot 
Bec must deal with the painful reality of Matt's death, Frances's sense of security is deeply affected following a terrifying episode, Jenny is adjusting to a new life in the wake of a bombshell secret shaking the Gross family to the core, and Sophie discovers her feelings for Doug re-emerging after she returns from a traumatic trip to Nairobi. New loves enter the fray and mixed emotions make for tricky decisions. There's a lot our leading ladies must face up to. Will old loves endure? Will lives be changed forever?

Cast

Main 
 Melissa Bergland as Jenny Gross
 Virginia Gay as Frances James
 Zoe Tuckwell-Smith as Bec Gilbert
 Melanie Vallejo as Sophie Wong
 Katherine Hicks as Sam MacKenzie
 Tom Wren as Doug Graham
 Sibylla Budd as Carla Hughes (13 episodes)
 Damien Bodie as Jonathan Kurtiss (24 episodes)
 Stephen Phillips as Zach Armstrong (22 episodes)
 Mike Smith as Callum Gilbert (12 episodes)
 Tom Hobbs as Flynn Johnson
 Jack Pearson as Patrick Gross (25 episodes)
 Denise Scott as Trish Gross
 Francis Greenslade as Brian Gross
 Sarah Grace as Bridget Fitzpatrick (24 episodes)

Recurring 
 PiaGrace Moon as Jasmine Patterson (20 episodes)
 David Paterson as Ryan Sharrock (13 episodes)
 Paul Moore as Wes Fitzpatrick (11 episodes)
 Anne Phelan as Dot Gross (11 episodes)
 Luke McKenzie as Shannon Taylor (10 episodes)
 Ryan Hayward as Brett Tully (7 episodes)
 Ben Geurens as Adam Grbowski (7 episodes)
 Nell Feeney as Carolyn Gilbert (5 episodes)
 Danielle Horvat as Coco Jones (5 episodes)
 Dieter Brummer as Jason Ross (5 episodes)
 Nick Russell as Gabe Reynolds (4 episodes)
 Davini Malcolm as Anna MacKenzie (3 episodes)
 Amelia Best as Stephanie Hennessey (3 episodes)
 Greg Stone as Steve Gilbert (3 episodes)
 Dan O'Connor as Nate Simpson (3 episodes)

Guest 
 Cassandra Magrath as Cynthia Tengrove (2 episodes)
 Dimitri Baveas as Noah Foley (2 episodes)
 Mahesh Jadu as Evan Madawella (2 episodes)
 Pia Prendiville as Jess Byrnes (2 episodes)
 Zoe Bertram as Jacqui Grbowski (2 episodes)
 Brett Swain as Roy Grbowski (2 episodes)
 Nathin Butler as Luke MacKenzie (2 episodes)
 Nicki Paull as Leanne O'Connor (1 episode)
 Adam Lucas as Jackson Norton (1 episode)
 Fletcher Humphrys as Lincoln Sullivan (1 episode)
 Roger Oakley as Pat O'Keeffe (1 episode)
 Ronald Falk as Ken Ross (1 episode)
 Todd McKenney as Bryce Thomson (1 episode)
 Nick Simpson-Deeks as Rhys Mitchell (1 episode)

Casting 
Blair McDonough did not return due to his character's death in the season two finale. Katherine Hicks was promoted to the main cast as Sam MacKenzie.

Episodes

{| class="wikitable plainrowheaders" style="margin: auto; width: 100%"
|-
!! style="background-color:#ffa500; color: #000; text-align: center;" width=5%|No. inseries
!! style="background-color:#ffa500; color: #000; text-align: center;" width=5%|No. inseason
!! style="background-color:#ffa500; color: #000; text-align: center;" width=25%|Title
!! style="background-color:#ffa500; color: #000; text-align: center;" width=16%|Directed by
!! style="background-color:#ffa500; color: #000; text-align: center;" width=28%|Written by
!! style="background-color:#ffa500; color: #000; text-align: center;" width=14%|Original air date
!! style="background-color:#ffa500; color: #000; text-align: center;" width=7%|Australian viewers
|-

|}

DVD release

References

External links
 

2013 Australian television seasons
2014 Australian television seasons
Split television seasons